Mazda uses a number of different Proving Grounds to test their vehicles.

Miyoshi Proving Ground – Hiroshima, Japan
Miyoshi Proving Ground is Mazda's primary testing facility, located in Miyoshi, Hiroshima, Japan and is owned by the company. Facilities include a banked high speed test track, wind tunnel, crash test facility, and durability testing. In addition, a diesel engine assembly plant is located on the site.

Latitude and Longitude:

Mine Proving Grounds (MPG) – Nagao, Japan

The site was acquired by Mazda Corporation from CQ Motors Corporation, Tokyo in February–March 2006, after the previous company withdrew from the racing circuit business. The current setup includes: a  circuit course, control tower, gymkhana space, pit area, paddocks, and viewing stands. Mazda added high speed straights for slalom performance testing, a European style mid-range handling road and a high speed hillclimb/low friction road for brake system assessment.

Gross Area: . Total floor area:  (includes all office buildings and other equipment on the land).

Location: 1173-1 Nagao, Nishiatsu-cho, Mine City, Yamaguchi Prefecture. Latitude and Longitude:

Kenbuchi Proving Ground – Kamikawa, Hokkaido, Japan
Kenbuchi Proving Ground is an automobile testing facility in Kamikawa, Hokkaido, Japan owned by Mazda Motor Corporation. The facility is primarily used for cold-weather testing including systems such as AWD, ABS, TCS, and DSC. The facility was established in January 1990. It includes  of land.

Latitude and Longitude:

Nakasatsunai Proving Ground – Kasai, Hokkaido, Japan
Nakasatsunai  Proving Ground is an automobile testing facility in Kasai, Hokkaido, Japan owned by Mazda Motor Corporation. The facility, opened in January 2002, is primarily used for cold-weather testing. It includes  of land.

Latitude and Longitude:

Arizona Proving Grounds - Wittmann, Arizona, USA
Mazda uses Ford's Arizona Proving Grounds in Wittmann, Arizona, United States on a contract basis for hot weather durability testing, sun exposure testing, climate control validation, and dust intrusion testing.

Latitude and Longitude:

See also
List of Mazda facilities

References

Mazda
Road test tracks by manufacturer